Olivier Brochard (born February 2, 1967 in Charleville-Mézières, France) is a former professional footballer. He played as a defender. He was manager of Olympique Saint-Quentin in the 2007–08 season, but left after the club were relegated from the Championnat de France amateur 2.

External links
Olivier Brochard profile at chamoisfc79.fr

1967 births
Living people
French footballers
French football managers
Association football defenders
CS Sedan Ardennes players
Amiens SC players
Chamois Niortais F.C. players
Tours FC players
Ligue 2 players
SC Abbeville players
People from Charleville-Mézières
Sportspeople from Ardennes (department)
Olympique Saint-Quentin managers
Footballers from Grand Est